The Battle of Schärding on 17 January 1742, was a battle in the War of the Austrian Succession near present German border. It ended with a victory for Khevenhüller's Austrian forces.

References 

History of Austria
Schärding District
Scharding
Scharding
1742 in Austria
Scharding
Scharding